
Year 688 (DCLXXXVIII) was a leap year starting on Wednesday (link will display the full calendar) of the Julian calendar. The denomination 688 for this year has been used since the early medieval period, when the Anno Domini calendar era became the prevalent method in Europe for naming years.

Events 
 By place 
 Byzantine Empire 
 Byzantine–Bulgarian War: Emperor Justinian II carries out a Balkan campaign and marches through Thrace, where he restores Byzantine rule. He establishes a theme administration, and migrates many Bulgars and Slavs to the Opsician Theme (Asia Minor).
 Justinian II reestablishes Byzantine settlement on Cyprus, signing a treaty  with Umayyad caliph Abd al-Malik (and paying an annual tribute) for joint occupation of the island.

 Europe 
 King Perctarit of the Lombards is  assassinated by a conspiracy, after a 17-year reign. He is succeeded by his son Cunipert, who is crowned ruler of the Lombard Kingdom in Italy.
 Alahis, duke of Brescia, starts a civil war in Northern Italy. He besieges Cunipert on an island in Lake Como (Lombardy), who breaks out with Piedmontese troops. 

 Britain 
 King Caedwalla of Wessex abdicates the throne and departs on a pilgrimage to Rome, possibly because of the wounds he suffered while fighting on the Isle of Wight. The power vacuum is filled by Ine, son of his second cousin, sub-king Coenred of Dorset. 
 King Æthelred of Mercia establishes Mercian dominance over most of Southern England. He installs Oswine, minor member of the Kentish royal family (second cousin of king Eadric), as king of Kent. Prince Swæfheard of Essex is given West Kent.

 By topic 
 Religion 
 Eadberht is appointed bishop of Lindisfarne (Northumbria). He founds the holy shrine to his predecessor Cuthbert, a place that becomes a centre of great pilgrimage in later years.

Births 
 Charles Martel, Frankish statesman and founder of the Carolingian Dynasty (d. 741)
 Jianzhen, Chinese Buddhist monk (d. 763)
 Wang Zhihuan, Chinese poet (d. 742)

Deaths 
 May 24 – Ségéne, bishop of Armagh (b. c. 610)
 Abu al-Aswad al-Du'ali, Muslim scholar (or 689)
 Máel Dúin mac Conaill, king of Dál Riata (Scotland)
 Perctarit, king of the Lombards
 Rictrude, Frankish abbess

References 

 

da:680'erne#688